Selakjan may refer to:
 Selakjan, Rudsar
 Selakjan, Kelachay, Rudsar County